In My World is the debut studio album by Australian new wave/power pop band, V Capri.
The album peaked at number 52 on the Australian Kent Music Report.

Track listing
LP/Cassette

Charts

References

Mushroom Records albums
1986 debut albums